Gregory Wong Chung-yiu (born 2 October 1978) is a Hong Kong actor. His notable roles include Lan Kwai Fong (2011), The Election (2014) and The Menu (2015).

On April 29, 2015, Wong renewed his contract with China 3D Digital Entertainment for another 5 years.

Education
At the age of 14, Wong left Ying Wa College in New Kowloon for Britain to study at a boarding school. He returned to Hong Kong after graduating from the University College London at the age of 23.

Activism
Wong supported the pro-democratic movement in the 2019–20 Hong Kong protests. He was arrested in October 2019 in relation to the Storming of the Legislative Council Complex on 1 July 2019.

Filmography

Films

Television

References

External links
 
 

1978 births
Living people
Hong Kong male film actors
Hong Kong male television actors
21st-century Hong Kong male actors
Alumni of University College London